The First Baptist Church is a historic Baptist church at 1 Virginia Street in Bristol, Virginia.  It is a rectangular -story brick structure, resembling a Greek temple of the Ionic order.  Its front facade is divided by six round columns, which support an entablature and fully pedimented gable.  There are three entrances sheltered by this portico.  The side walls are divided into bays articulated by Doric pilasters, with sash windows topped by individual clerestory-style windows.  Built in 1912, and enlarged in 1964, it is one of the most imposing examples of Classical Revival architecture in southwestern Virginia.

The building was added to the National Register of Historic Places in 2015.

See also
National Register of Historic Places listings in Bristol, Virginia

References

External links
First Baptist Church of Bristol web site

Churches on the National Register of Historic Places in Virginia
Baptist churches in Virginia
Neoclassical architecture in Virginia
Churches completed in 1912
Buildings and structures in Bristol, Virginia
National Register of Historic Places in Bristol, Virginia
Neoclassical church buildings in the United States